"Kiss 'n' Tell" is a song written by Eve von Bibra and Brett Goldsmith and recorded by Australia group Chantoozies. The song was released in September 1988 as the fourth and final single from their debut studio album, Chantoozies (1988). The song peaked at number 25 in Australia, becoming the group's fourth consecutive top 40 single.

Track listings
7" single (K 620)
Side A "Kiss 'n' Tell" - 4:05
Side B "Want to Go"

12" single (X 13332)
Side A "Kiss 'n' Tell"  (12" version) 
Side B "Want to Go"

Charts

References

Songs about kissing
1988 songs
1988 singles
Mushroom Records singles
Chantoozies songs